Robert Thomas Kaiser (born April 29, 1950) is an American former Major League Baseball pitcher, a left-handed reliever who appeared in five games for the Cleveland Indians during the 1971 season.

Selected in the second round in the 1968 Major League Baseball Draft, Kaiser was recalled by Cleveland after spending the 1971 season at three levels of minor league baseball, Class A through Triple-A. In his MLB debut, he surrendered a home run to the first batter he faced, Duane Josephson of the Boston Red Sox. But he finished the inning strongly by striking out a future Hall of Famer, Carl Yastrzemski.

All told, he allowed eight hits and three earned runs in six MLB innings pitched, with three bases on balls and four strikeouts. He did not record a save.

References

External links

1950 births
Living people
Major League Baseball pitchers
Cleveland Indians players
Anderson Tigers players
Gulf Coast Indians players
Reno Silver Sox players
Savannah Indians players
Wichita Aeros players
Lakeland Tigers players
Montgomery Rebels players
San Antonio Brewers players
Portland Beavers players
Jacksonville Suns players
Elmira Pioneers players
Clinton Pilots players
Baseball players from Cincinnati